The 2009 IIHF World U18 Championship Division II was an international under-18 ice hockey competition organised by the International Ice Hockey Federation. Both Division II tournaments made up the third level of competition of the 2009 IIHF World U18 Championships. The Group A tournament took place between 22 and 28 March 2009 in Maribor, Slovenia and the Group B tournament took place between 16 and 22 March 2009 in Narva, Estonia. South Korea and Great Britain won the Group A and B tournaments respectively and gained promotion to Division I of the 2010 IIHF World U18 Championships.

Group A

The following teams took part in Group A of Division II tournament, which was played in Maribor, Slovenia at Tabor Ice Hall from March 22 through March 28, 2009.

 is promoted to Division I for the 2010 IIHF World U18 Championships 
 is relegated to Division III for the 2010 IIHF World U18 Championships

Results

All times local

Group B
The following teams took part Group B of the Division II tournament, which was played in Narva, Estonia at Kreenholm Ice Hall from March 16 through March 22, 2009.

 is promoted to Division I for the 2010 IIHF World U18 Championships 
 is relegated to Division III for the 2010 IIHF World U18 Championships

Results

All times local

See also
2009 IIHF World U18 Championships
2009 IIHF World U18 Championship Division I
2009 IIHF World U18 Championship Division III

External links
Official results and statistics from the International Ice Hockey Federation
Division II - Group A
Division II - Group B

IIHF World U18 Championship Division II
II
International ice hockey competitions hosted by Estonia
International ice hockey competitions hosted by Slovenia
World
World